Süleyman Sami Demirel (1 November 1924 – 17 June 2015) was a Turkish politician, engineer, and statesman who served as the 9th President of Turkey from 1993 to 2000. He previously served as the Prime Minister of Turkey seven times between the years 1965 and 1993. He was the leader of the Justice Party (AP) from 1964 to 1980 and the leader of the True Path Party (DYP) from 1987 to 1993.

Having been identified as a potential future Prime Minister by Adnan Menderes, Demirel was elected leader of the Justice Party in 1964 and managed to bring down the government of İsmet İnönü in 1965 despite not being a Member of Parliament. He supported the government of Suat Hayri Ürgüplü until his party won a parliamentary majority in 1965. He became the first Prime Minister born in the Republic of Turkey. Claiming that his Justice Party was the successor of the banned Democrat Party, he was re-elected as premier in 1969 by winning a parliamentary majority for a second time. Despite his economic reforms which stabilised inflation, he resigned after his budget was blocked by parliament, but formed his third government shortly after. His premiership came to an end following the 1971 Turkish coup d'état.

Demirel was the leader of the opposition from 1971 to 1975 before forming a right-wing government known as the First Nationalist Front, which collapsed in 1977. He formed the Second Nationalist Front cabinet in 1977, which collapsed in 1978. Demirel's minority government in 1979 was unable to elect a president in 1980, leading to the 1980 Turkish coup d'état which banned Demirel from politics. Returning to politics in 1987, he assumed the leadership of the True Path Party. He won the 1991 general election and formed a coalition with the Social Democratic Populist Party (SHP), assuming his fifth and final term as Prime Minister. Following the sudden death of serving President Turgut Özal, Demirel contested the 1993 presidential election and subsequently became the ninth President of Turkey until 2000. With 10 years and 5 months, his tenure as premier is the third longest in Turkish history, after İsmet İnönü and Recep Tayyip Erdoğan.

Family
Süleyman Demirel was born on 1 November 1924, İslamköy, Atabey, a town in Isparta Province to Hacı Yahya Demirel (1893–1972) and Hacı Ümmühan Demirel (1902–1979). He was a shepherd in his childhood. Upon completion of his elementary school education in his hometown, he attended middle and high schools in Isparta, Muğla, and Afyon. In 1948, he married Nazmiye Şener, his second cousin.

Engineering career
After graduating from the school of civil engineering at the Istanbul Technical University in 1949, Süleyman Demirel worked in the State Department for electrical power planning. He undertook postgraduate studies on irrigation, electrical technologies, and dam construction in the United States, first in 1949–1950, then in 1954–1955. During the construction of the Seyhan Dam, Demirel worked as a project engineer and in 1954 was appointed Director of the Department of Dams. In 1955, he served as Director General of the State Hydraulic Works (DSİ). As such, Demirel supervised the construction of a various power plants, dams and irrigation facilities. Eisenhower Fellowships selected Süleyman Demirel in 1954 to represent Turkey.

After the coup d'état in 1960, he was drafted to the Turkish Army for compulsory military service. Upon completion of his military service, he worked as a freelance engineer and a representative of Morrison Construction, a U.S. company. During this period, he also worked as a part-time lecturer of hydraulic engineering at the Middle East Technical University (ODTÜ) in Ankara.

Entry to politics
His political career started with his election to the executive board of the Justice Party, founded by the former general Ragıp Gümüşpala as a replacement of the Democrat Party that was banned after the military coup of 27 May 1960. Journalist and MP Cihat Baban claims in The Gallery of Politics (Politika Galerisi), that President Cemal Gürsel told him:

Demirel's rural, central Anatolian accent and the fact that he came from a village from the countryside made him very appealing to rural voters.
On 22 March 1963, the imprisoned former president Celal Bayar was released on parole, causing protests in front of Justice Party headquarters. Demirel resigned from his position during the ordeal, and claimed that "There wouldn't be democracy in this country for another 50 years". He remained politically inactive until the death of Ragıp Gümüşpala in June 1964 when he re-entered politics as a candidate for chairman of the party. However, Demirel faced strong opposition. His biggest rival was Sadettin Bilgiç, nicknamed "koca reis" (Turkish: "big captain"). Bilgiç supporters accused Demirel of being a freemason; While this was true, Demirel averted the crisis with a lie. Instead of writing to his own lodge, he petitioned a separate freemason's lodge asking whether he was a member or not. As expected, the lodge chairman answered negatively. This turned the tide in Demirel's favor, and he received enough votes to become the chairman of the Justice Party, receiving 1,072 votes to Bilgiç's 552, and Tekin Arıburun's 39.

Demirel was elected chairman at the second grand party convention on 28 November 1964. He facilitated the formation of a caretaker government that ruled between February and October 1965 under the premiership of Suat Hayri Ürgüplü in which he served as Deputy Prime Minister. Under his leadership, the Justice Party won an unprecedented majority of the votes in the 1965 general election and formed a majority government. Demirel thus became the youngest-ever Prime Minister in Turkish history at the age of 40.

First premiership 

Demirel was one of the first of a new generation born in the 1920s that were now entering politics known as the "Republican Generation", during which heroes of the Turkish War of Independence such as İsmet İnönü, Celâl Bayar and Ragıp Gümüşpala were gradually withdrawing from politics.

Shortly after coming to power he faced was the "Presidential crisis" when Cemal Gürsel, who assumed the presidency after the adoption of the 1961 Constitution, stated that his poor health prevented him from continuing his duty. Demirel nominated the Chief of the General Staff, Cevdet Sunay for the presidency in order to soften the army's attitude towards the Justice Party, who became president in 1966.

In the next elections on 10 October 1969, his party was the sole winner by a landslide once again. Demirel presided over the laying the foundations of the Keban Dam, the Bosphorus Bridge and an oil pipeline between Batman and İskenderun. Economic reforms stabilized inflation, and Turkey became one of the fastest growing economies. However boycotts and strikes by university students in 1968 began political instability which especially concerned the Turkish military. Pressure was also mounting from the United States, as the Nixon Administration wished for Turkey to ban the cultivation of opium, which would have been politically costly for Demirel to implement. Demirel also had trouble brewing inside his own party, as while he attempted to issue an amnesty to ex-Democrats, he was effectively vetoed by the Turkish military. As a result, in 1970, several ex-DP deputies left the Justice Party to found the Democratic Party, while the Islamists also left to found the National Order Party under Necmettin Erbakan.

The chaotic seventies

1971 Memorandum

A worsening economy, the 15-16 June events, one of the biggest workers' protests in the history of Turkey; disagreements between the government and military over the Cyprus dispute, escalations of tensions with Greece, and conflict between leftists and rightists served to define the last years of Demirel's first premiership as politically unstable. He blamed the liberal constitution for the crisis. He resigned as Prime Minister after his budget was blocked by parliament but formed his third government shortly after. A military coup attempt by National Democratic Revolutionaries on 9 March 1971 finally resulted in a direct military intervention on 12 March, and Demirel resigned for a military-supported government under Nihat Erim.

The constitutional amendments that Demirel wished for were implemented during technocratic military governance which relied on support from parliament. In the spring of 1973, with the presidential election on the agenda, to counter the Military's influence over national politics, he reached an agreement with the new leader of the Republican People's Party (CHP), Bülent Ecevit, to support Fahri Korutürk as president instead of Former Chief of Staff of Turkish Military Faruk Gürler. During the election process, Military tanks were positioned near Grand National Assembly of Turkey to indicate to MPs that the Armed Forces might intervene.

Nationalist Front governments
With the Justice Party emerging second in the general election in 1973, a grand CHP-AP coalition was expected. However, Demirel announced that "We can only come together in war." CHP instead formed a coalition with Erbakan's new Islamist party, the National Salvation Party (MSP). Ecevit's government carried out the Invasion of Cyprus, but ideological conflicts in the government prompted Ecevit to resign on 18 September 1974 and hold early elections. However early elections never happened, and instead Sadi Irmak had to head a caretaker government that lasted for more than 200 days from September 1974 to March 1975. March 31, under the leadership of Demirel, a right-wing coalition government was established consisting of the Justice Party, MSP, the Nationalist Movement Party (MHP), and the Republican Reliance Party that was known as the "First Nationalist Front". In order for the coalition to survive, Islamist MSP supporters and ultranationalist MHP members were recruited within state institutions, intensifying the renewed political violence of the 1970s. 42 people were killed in a 1977 May Day ralley at Taksim Square. The country entered an economic depression caused by a rise in global petrol prices, deficit in foreign payments and rapid inflation. Süleyman Demirel's nephew, Yahya Kemal Demirel, was arrested for corruption after an investigation by the journalist Uğur Mumcu during this period.

Despite gaining support in the 1977 elections the Justice Party again lost to CHP, which received 41.4 percent of the vote. However, Ecevit was not able to form a government, so Demirel became prime minister again, forming the Second Nationalist Front with only MSP and MHP. This government fell in a no-confidence vote on December 31, 1977, in what was known as the Güneş Motel Incident, where 13 Justice Party MPs defected from their party to support a CHP government where they received cabinet positions. Demirel refused to establish a dialogue with the CHP-dominated government and conducted a vicious opposition to Ecevit, constantly referred to him as "head of government" instead of "prime minister". Referring to Ecevit's government, Demirel said "In no country in the world, could such a government [Ecevit's] with 1200 deaths, 70% inflation, disrepute, cruelty, torture, unjust and merciless partisanship stand for even one day. A cadre that has exceeded its ambition has usurped the administration." On February 21, 1979, he announced to President Korutürk that they were against the extension of martial law.

The troubles brought by American embargo, inflation, and escalating political violence meant Ecevit lost the 1979 by-elections, prompting his resignation. Demirel returned as prime minister, and established a minority government due to the negative atmosphere created by the Nationalist Front governments (MSP and MHP still provided confidence). His last premiership before the 1980 coup saw the implementation of the 24 January decisions which proved to be a turning point in Turkey's transition to a neoliberal economy. With political violence and assassinations at an all-time high, top military generals delivered a memorandum to President Korutürk, urging for politicians to put aside their differences to solve the country's problems, but this memerandum did nothing to get Demirel and Ecevit to cooperate. As Fahri Korutürk's presidential term was ending, a crisis brewed as to who would succeed him, with Demirel and Ecevit failing 115 times to elect a new president. Demirel's government lasted until the coup of 12 September 1980, which banned him from politics.

Demirel opened 268 İmam Hatip schools in his premierships between 1965 and 1980, becoming one of the politicians who opened the most İmam Hatip schools.

Ban from politics

With the military coup on 12 September 1980, Demirel's prime ministry ended and he was kept under surveillance in Hamzaköy, Gelibolu for a month. He did not resign as chairman of the Justice Party until it was dissolved in 1981. With a provisional article in the new Constitution, he and most politicians were banned from politics for 10 years. However, he maintained ties with his party's former leaders. After political parties were allowed to be established in May 1983, Demirel declared, "I do not build shanty houses on my land with a title deed." He did not support the party that the military administration tried to have Bülend Ulusu founded, the Nationalist Democracy Party, nor the Motherland Party (ANAP) led by his protégé Turgut Özal. On May 20, 1983, the Great Turkey Party (BTP) was established by former Justice Party members, but it was swiftly banned by the National Security Council on the grounds that it was a continuation of the Justice Party. Demirel, along with former CHP and Justice Party members was forced to stay for four months in Zincirbozan, Çanakkale, on the grounds that he violated the political ban.

Last premiership 

In 1986, Demirel launched a successful campaign for the lifting of pre-1980 politicians' political bans and initiated a referendum on the issue. Only 18 days after his political ban was rescinded, he was elected chairman at the extraordinary convention of the True Path Party (DYP), a new successor party to the Justice Party. He was re-elected Deputy of Isparta in the 1987 general election.

Following the 1991 election, Süleyman Demirel became Prime Minister once again in a coalition government with the Social Democratic Populist Party. Demirel acknowledged the distinction of Kurds being a different ethnicity from Turks, reformed criminal procedure law, removed the ban on all party names and abbreviations accumulated from military coups, and ratified international conventions on trade union freedoms. The "Green Card" social security program was also established and the age requirement for retirement was abolished. While the government had success combating far-left terrorist groups, the assassinations of journalist Uğur Mumcu and Gendarme commander Eşref Bitlis shocked the country. Though both coalition partners advocated for ending the OHAL zone and the village guard system in southeast Anatolia, Operation Provide Comfort meant the policies had to continue in the unstable region.

During this period, he carried out a strong opposition to his protégé and soon president, Turgut Özal, with whom he prepared the 24 January Decisions.

Presidency
After the sudden death of Özal, Demirel was elected the ninth President of Turkey in 1993 by the Grand National Assembly. Resigning his party chairmanship, his successor for leadership of DYP became Turkey's first female prime minister, Tansu Çiller.

President Demirel drew backlash from statements he made in the aftermath of the Sivas Massacre in which 35 intellectuals lost their lives when they were trapped in a burning hotel by a mob, which took place just one and a half months after he became president. He said "The incident is an isolated incident. There was heavy provocation. As a result of this provocation, the people were agitated... The security forces did their best... There was no conflict between the groups. There was [only] loss of life due to the burning of the hotel.”

Demirel gave Azerbaijani President Heydar Aliyev advanced notice of an upcoming coup attempt against his government backed by various factions of the Turkish army and intelligence services. President Demirel survived an assassination attempt in 1996 in a ribbon-cutting ceremony to open a shopping mall in İzmit. The would be assassin, İbrahim Gümrükçüoğlu said in his defence that he did not intend to kill the President, but that he intended to shoot into the air with his pistol to protest Turkey's military cooperation agreement with Israel. Doctors later diagnosed Gümrükçüoğlu with paranoia.

Demirel's role in the 1997 "Postmodern Coup" is controversial, with some accusing him of leading the effort to bring down Necmittin Erbakan's REFAHYOL government while others claimed that he prevented a complete military takeover by easing the tension. He did not appoint his protegé Tansu Çiller prime minister, but instead ANAP chairman Mesut Yılmaz. Erbakan's Welfare Party, Ciller's DYP and the BBP opposed the move.

In 1997, he participated in a conference organized by the Journalists and Writers Foundation, of which Fethullah Gülen was its honorary chairman, and received the "Statesman National Reconciliation Award" from Gülen.

Though there was an attempt to extend his presidential term by another five years, Demirel stepped down from the presidency on April 5. He handed over his duty to Ahmet Necdet Sezer on 16 May 2000. With his retirement from politics, his overall tenure as Prime Minister was shorter than only İsmet İnönü's and Recep Tayyip Erdogan's.

Later life and death

Following his retirement from politics, Demirel was a frequent panelist and speaker at several places, mostly in universities, within Turkey. His wife Nazmiye passed away on 27 May 2013, in the hospital where she was treated for Alzheimer's. Süleyman Demirel died on 17 June 2015 at the Güven hospital in Ankara where he had been undergoing treatment for a respiratory tract infection. After the state ceremony in the Turkish Grand National Assembly and a religious ceremony at Kocatepe Mosque on 19 June 2015, Demirel's body was taken to a mausoleum in his hometown of Atabey, Isparta. In 2019, the Süleyman Demirel Mausoleum was completed and opened to visitors.

Legacy

Demirel achieved many firsts throughout his political career. He formed the most governments, was longest serving prime minister in Turkish political history following İsmet İnönü and Recep Tayyip Erdoğan, and was the youngest prime minister at the age of 41. He also broke the records for the youngest politician to become a party leader at the age of 40, and the youngest general manager appointed to a public institution at the age of 30.

He was also accused of deviating from the principles of Mustafa Kemal Atatürk, which he denied.

The Süleyman Demirel Airport and Süleyman Demirel University, both of which are in Isparta are named after him. So are the Süleyman Demirel Stadium in Antalya, the Süleyman Demirel Medical Centre of the Atatürk University in Erzurum and Suleyman Demirel University in Kazakhstan. There are also two important main streets named after him: one in Istanbul and the other in Muğla. In 2014 Süleyman Demirel Democracy and Development Museum was opened in Isparta.

In popular culture
Süleyman Demirel was often nicknamed Baba (The Father) or Çoban Sülü (Sülü the Shepherd) and humorously Spartacus, after his native city of Isparta. His fedora hat was a famous part of his image.

With the song "Demirbaş" in the album Yadigâr (1995), Fikret Kızılok humorously described Demirel's inability to stay away from the political scene. "Süleyman", one of the hit songs of Barış Manço's 1992 album "Mega Manço", was another satire of Demirel. He was portrayed by Haldun Boysan in the 2007 movie "Zincirbozan". There are also references to Demirel in Cem Karaca's "Raptiye". Süleyman Demirel also appeared as a guest actor in the film "The President in the Other Turkey". Nejmi Aykar portrayed Demirel in the TV series Once Upon a Time in Cyprus, which was broadcast on TRT 1.

Although Demirel had retired, whenever there was political distress, Turkish media or his followers (humorously or otherwise) called on him with the words "Kurtar bizi baba" ("Father, save us"). He is well known for uttering phrases such as "Dün dündür, bugün bugündür" ("Yesterday is yesterday, today is today"), usually said when he has changed his stand on a subject. Another example is "Benzin vardı da biz mi içtik?" ("Did we drink the gasoline, as if there were any?"), said when defending his actions during the 1970s energy crisis. When the question of criminalizing sex work came to question by the increased popularity of conservative movements, he responded "Genelevleri kapatalım da millet bizi mi siksin?" ("Should we close the brothels so people can fuck us?").

Awards 
 Poland     :  Order of the White Eagle, 28 October 1993
 Croatia    :  Grand Order of King Tomislav, 7 July 1994
 Kyrgyzstan :  Order of Manas, 13 November 1998
 Azerbaijan :  Istiglal Order, 12 June 1999 
 Italy      :  Order of Merit of the Italian Republic, 7 October 1996
 Estonia    :  Order of the Cross of Terra Mariana, 1997
 Romania    :  Order of the Star of Romania, 1999
 Georgia :  Order of the Golden Fleece, 1999
 Bulgaria   :  Order of Stara Planina, 16 March 1999
 Germany    :  Order of Merit of the Federal Republic of Germany, 6 April 2000
 Kazakhstan :  Order of the Leopard, 27 August 2001
 Moldova    :   Order of the Republic, 1 November 2004
 Azerbaijan :  Sharaf Order, 1 November 2013

See also
 Conservatism in Turkey

References

External links

Official Website of the Presidents of the Republic of Turkey 

 

1924 births
2015 deaths
20th-century prime ministers of Turkey
20th-century presidents of Turkey
People from Atabey
Conservatism in Turkey
Justice Party (Turkey) politicians
Istanbul Technical University alumni
Leaders of political parties in Turkey
Prime Ministers of Turkey
Deputy Prime Ministers of Turkey
Leaders ousted by a coup
Presidents of Turkey
Deputies of Isparta
Süleyman Demirel University
Turkish civil engineers
Democrat Party (Turkey, current) politicians
People from Isparta
Respiratory disease deaths in Turkey
Infectious disease deaths in Turkey
Deaths from respiratory tract infection

Recipients of the Collar of the Order of the Cross of Terra Mariana
Recipients of the Order of the Star of Romania
Recipients of the Order of the Republic (Moldova)
Recipients of the Istiglal Order
Leaders of the Opposition (Turkey)
Members of the 29th government of Turkey
Members of the 30th government of Turkey
Members of the 31st government of Turkey
Members of the 32nd government of Turkey
Members of the 39th government of Turkey
Members of the 41st government of Turkey
Members of the 43rd government of Turkey
Members of the 49th government of Turkey
Grand Crosses Special Class of the Order of Merit of the Federal Republic of Germany
Centre-right politics in Turkey
Recipients of the Order of the White Eagle (Poland)
20th-century Turkish engineers
Turkish political party founders